Andinia is a genus of mollusks belonging to the family Clausiliidae.

The species of this genus are found in Southern America.

Species:
 Andinia taczanowskii (Lubomirski, 1879)

References

Gastropod genera
Clausiliidae